Barham Salih (born 12 September 1960) is an Iraqi Kurdish politician who served as the eighth president of Iraq from 2018 to 2022. 

He is the former prime minister of the Kurdistan Region and a former deputy prime minister of the Iraqi federal government. He was elected and assumed office as president of Iraq on 2 October 2018. On October 2022 he lost his re-election to Abdul Latif Rashid.

Early life and education
Salih was born in 1960 in Sulaymaniyah. He was arrested in 1979 by the Ba'athist regime twice on charges of involvement in the Kurdish national movement by taking some photos of protesters in Sulaimaniya city and spent 43 days in detention in a Special Investigation Commission prison in Kirkuk where he was tortured. Once released, he finished high school and left Iraq for the United Kingdom to flee continued persecution.

Personal life
Salih is married to Sarbagh Salih, the head and founding member of the Kurdish Botanical Foundation and a women's rights activist. The couple have two children.

Career

Deputy Secretary General of Patriotic Union of Kurdistan
Barham Salih joined the Patriotic Union of Kurdistan (PUK) in late 1976 where he became a member of the PUK department of Europe, and was in charge of PUK foreign relations in London. In addition to the political struggle, he finished his university studies and received a Bachelors degree in Civil Engineering and Construction from the Cardiff University in 1983. He continued to study and obtained a Doctorate degree in Statistics and Computer Applications in Engineering from the University of Liverpool in 1987.

He was elected a member of the PUK leadership at the first party conference when Iraqi Kurdistan was liberated from the Ba'ath Party following the Persian Gulf War. He was assigned the task of heading the PUK Office in the United States.

After the fall of the Ba'athist regime in 2003, he became Deputy Prime Minister in the Interim Iraqi Government in mid-2004, Minister of Planning in the Transitional Government in 2005, and Deputy Prime Minister in the elected Iraqi Government (Nouri al-Maliki's Cabinet) in charge of the economic portfolio and Head of the Economic Committee. Representing the Iraqi Government, he launched the International Compact with Iraq – an initiative of mutual commitment between Iraq and the international community to help Iraq in meeting its obligations of "building a prosperous, democratic and federal country, in peace with itself and with the region and the world".

Salih appeared on The Colbert Report on 10 June 2009, broadcast from Baghdad, and was interviewed by the host. He praised the U.S. military for sending troops into Iraq, and acknowledged that many Kurds desire independence.

Prime Minister of the Kurdistan Region Government
Barham Salih spearheaded the Kurdistani List in the 2009 Iraqi Kurdistan legislative election. The list won 59 of 111 seats. He succeeded Nechervan Idris Barzani as the Prime Minister of the Kurdistan Regional Government. His term was marked by turbulence with the rise of an opposition (Movement for Change) to challenge the government while his own party was scrambling to stay together after losing the stronghold city of Sulaymaniyah. He survived the first motion of no confidence in Iraqi Kurdistan following the 2011 Kurdish protests in Iraq. He signed the first major oil contract with Exxon Mobil after drafting and amending a new oil law. He relinquished the post of Prime Minister to Nechervan Idris Barzani on 5 April 2012 as part of a political agreement between the ruling KDP–PUK coalition.

Move to opposition 
In September 2017, Salih announced that he was leaving the PUK and forming a new opposition party, the Coalition for Democracy and Justice, to compete in the forthcoming Iraqi Kurdistan elections. Following the death of PUK leader Jalal Talabani and the Kurdish opposition leader Nawshirwan Mustafa, the alliance was seen to have the potential to change the Kurdish political landscape. He said he hoped to gather all the other opposition parties, including Gorran and Komal, to challenge the governing KDP–PUK alliance.

President of Iraq
On 2 October 2018, Barham Salih was elected as the eighth president of Iraq. He received 219 votes and defeated Fuad Hussein who secured 22 votes.

Salih condemned the 2019 Turkish offensive into north-eastern Syria, stating that it "will cause untold humanitarian suffering, empower terrorist  groups. The world must unite to avert a catastrophe, promote political resolution to the rights of all Syrians, including Kurds, to peace, dignity and security".

In March 2019, Salih submitted the groundbreaking “Yazidi Female Survivors Law” to Parliament for review. The ground-breaking bill set forth a number of reparation measures for female Yazidi survivors of captivity. It was seen by the Yazidi leaders as an important step toward a secure future for the survivors, and so they could move on and rebuild their homes, which were destroyed by IS fighting. On March 1, 2021, Parliament passed the Yazidi [Female] Survivors Bill into law, and the law was welcomed by Nadia Murad as "an important first step in acknowledging the gender-based trauma of sexual violence and need for tangible redress."

On 24 September 2019, President Salih had his first bilateral meeting with U.S. President Donald Trump.

On 26 December 2019, Salih submitted a letter of resignation after refusing to appoint Basra Governor Asaad Al Eidani as Prime Minister following the resignation of Adil Abdul-Mahdi, amid ongoing protests across the country. Salih stated that Al Eidani would not be approved by the demonstrators.

Assassination attempt 
On April 2, 2002 Barham Salih was exposed to an assassination attempt by Ansar al-Islam group, Salih survived the assassination attempt.

Criticism
On 19 September 2018, the announcement that Barham Salih will be the PUK's candidate for the post of Iraqi president was greeted with anger by many on social media while others expressed hope that his international reputation and experience would bring a steady hand to tumultuous Baghdad. 
Some took to the social media platform to call Salih out for perceived opportunism, noting he had just recently been campaigning against PUK and KDP corruption.

References

External links

Dr. Barham Salih's official website

1960 births
People from Sulaymaniyah
Iraqi Kurdish people
Living people
Alumni of Cardiff University
Members of the Council of Representatives of Iraq
Government ministers of Iraq
Kurdish Muslims
Patriotic Union of Kurdistan politicians
Presidents of Iraq
Prime Ministers of Kurdistan Region
Kurdish politicians